Akhilesh is a given name. Notable people with the name include:

Akhilesh Das (1961–2017), educationist, professor, Indian politician and philanthropist
Akhilesh K. Gaharwar (born 1982), Indian academic and Professor at Texas A&M University
Akhilesh Jaiswal (born 1986), Indian film director and screenwriter
Akhilesh Reddy, British physician-scientist at the Francis Crick Institute in London
Akhilesh Sahani (born 1994), Indian cricketer
Akhilesh Prasad Singh (born 1962), Indian politician and former Member of parliament of the 14th Lok Sabha
Akhilesh Pratap Singh, Indian politician and a member of the 16th Legislative Assembly of Uttar Pradesh
Akhilesh Pati Tripathi, Indian politician belonging to Aam Aadmi Party
Akhilesh Kumar Tyagi (born 1956), Indian plant biologist and the director of National Institute of Plant Genome Research
Akhilesh Yadav (born 1973), Indian politician and the current President of the Samajwadi Party

See also
Dr. Akhilesh Das Gupta Institute of Technology and Management in New Delhi, India
Dr. Akhilesh Das Gupta Stadium, multi-purpose stadium in the campus of Babu Banarasi Das University, Lucknow, India
Akhil (disambiguation)